Kopiec  is a settlement in the administrative district of Gmina Ostrówek, within Wieluń County, Łódź Voivodeship, in central Poland.

References

Villages in Wieluń County